Smoking is a brand of rolling papers, manufactured by Miquel y Costas in Barcelona, Spain.  According to their website, they were one of the earliest factories to produce rolling papers. Smoking offers different color packages to differentiate the weights or materials of the paper inside.

History 
1725 is the earliest documented reference of this company. At that time the Miquel family made paper by hand in mills driven by the Anoia River. It was not until almost 100 years later that the Miquel family started specializing in cigarette paper. In 1879, the company moved production to La Pobla de Claramunt and founded the company Miquel y Costas Hermanos.

In 1929, the company was incorporated and took its present name, Miquel y Costas & Miquel S.A.  Cigarette paper booklets first appeared in the 19th century and their international brand, Smoking, was introduced in 1924.  Miquel y Costas is now one of the largest cigarette paper manufacturers in the world. They manufacture Smoking, Pure Hemp, Guarani, Bugler, Bob Marley, SMK, Mantra and Bambu brand papers. They also produce many private label brands for other companies.

See also

 List of rolling papers

References

Cigarette rolling papers